Joseph Ira Dassin (5 November 1938 – 20 August 1980) was an American–French singer-songwriter and actor. He was the son of film director Jules Dassin.

Early life
Dassin was born in New York City to American film director Jules Dassin (1911–2008) and Béatrice Launer (1913–1994), a New York-born violinist, who after graduating from a Hebrew High School in the Bronx studied with the British violinist Harold Berkely at the Juilliard School of Music. His father was of Ukrainian-Jewish and Polish-Jewish extraction, his maternal grandfather was an Austrian-Jewish immigrant, who arrived in New York with his family at age 11.

Dassin lived in New York City and Los Angeles until his father fell victim to the Hollywood blacklist in 1950, at which time his family moved to Europe.

Between the ages of ten and fifteen Dassin changed schools eleven times. He studied at, among other places, the International School of Geneva and the Institut Le Rosey in Switzerland, and finished his secondary education in Grenoble. Dassin moved back to the United States, where he attended the University of Michigan in Ann Arbor, Michigan from 1957 to 1963, winning an undergraduate Hopwood Award for fiction in 1958 and earning a Bachelor of Arts in 1961 and a Master of Arts in 1963, both in Anthropology.

Career
Moving to France, Dassin worked as a technician for his father and appeared as an actor in supporting roles, among others in three movies directed by his father, including Topkapi (1964) in which he played the role of Josef.

On 26 December 1964, Dassin signed with CBS Records, making him the first French-language singer to be signed with an American record label.

By the early 1970s, Dassin's songs were at the top of the charts in France, and he became immensely popular there. He recorded songs in German, Spanish, Italian, and Greek, as well as French and English. Amongst his most popular songs are "Les Champs-Élysées" (Originally "Waterloo Road") (1969), "Salut les amoureux" (originally "City of New Orleans") (1973), "L'Été indien" (1975), "Et si tu n'existais pas" (1975), and "À toi" (1976).

Cinema
Joe Dassin appeared in the following movies:

 1957: Benos in He Who Must Die, by Jules Dassin 
 1958: Nico in The Law, by Jules Dassin
 1964: Joseph in Topkapi, by Jules Dassin
 1965: A police inspector in Lady L, by Peter Ustinov
 1965: Janos Adler in Nick Carter and Red Club, by Jean-Paul Savignac

Personal life

Dassin married Maryse Massiéra in Paris on 18 January 1966. Their son Joshua was born two and a half months early on 12 September 1973, and died five days later. Overcome by grief, Joe became deeply depressed. Despite all their efforts, their marriage did not survive. In 1977, one year after their move to their newly built home in Feucherolles, just outside Paris, they divorced.

On 14 January 1978, Dassin married Christine Delvaux in Cotignac. Their first son, Jonathan, was born on 14 September 1978; and their second son, Julien, arrived on 22 March 1980. Christine died in December 1995.

Death
Dassin died from a heart attack during a vacation to Tahiti on 20 August 1980. He was eating lunch with family and friends at the restaurant Chez Michel et Éliane in Papeete when he suddenly slumped in his chair, unconscious. A doctor who was also eating at the restaurant gave Dassin a heart massage, but Dassin died at the restaurant. The only ambulance in Papeete was unavailable at the time and took 40 minutes to arrive. His body is interred in the Beth Olam section of Hollywood Forever Cemetery in Hollywood, California.

Tributes
In 2020, many established artists paid tribute to Joe Dassin songs in a covers / tribute album À toi, Joe Dassin. The album peaked at No. 44 in the French SNEP Albums chart. It also charted in Belgium peaking at No. 26 in the country's Ultratop albums francophone chart and also peaking at No. 4 in the Swiss Hitparade Albums chart. Artists interpreting Joe Dassin songs on the album included Ycare, Axelle Red, Les Frangines, Trois Cafés Gourmands, Patrick Fiori, Lola Dubini, Jérémy Frerot, Tibz, Aldebert, Kids United Nouvelle Génération, Carla, Jonathan Dassin, Madame Monsieur, Julien Dassin, La Deryves, 21 Juin Le Duo, and Camélia Jordana.

Discography

References

External links

1938 births
1980 deaths
American folk guitarists
American male guitarists
American pop guitarists
American people of Austrian-Jewish descent
American people of Russian-Jewish descent
American people of Polish-Jewish descent
American male singer-songwriters
American expatriates in Switzerland
American emigrants to France
French male guitarists
French male singer-songwriters
French people of American descent
French people of Austrian-Jewish descent
French people of Russian-Jewish descent
French people of Polish-Jewish descent
French-language singers of the United States
Jewish American musicians
Jewish singers
Singers from New York City
University of Michigan College of Literature, Science, and the Arts alumni
CBS Records artists
Columbia Records artists
RCA Records artists
Burials at Hollywood Forever Cemetery
20th-century American singers
20th-century American guitarists
Guitarists from New York City
20th-century American male singers
Hopwood Award winners
Deaths in Tahiti
International School of Geneva alumni
Singer-songwriters from New York (state)
Alumni of Institut Le Rosey